The Paintsville Country Club is a historic country club located immediately east of Paintsville, Kentucky, United States. The land on which the building is located was donated by Paul B. Hall, who was Paintsville Medical Center's Chief of Staff in 1934-1981. Although the city of Paintsville owns the country club, the golf course is privately owned. The building was added to the National Register of Historic Places on 29 January 1989.

The clubhouse was constructed by the Works Progress Administration. The sandstone used in the construction was cut from nearby Kentucky Route 40 between Thelma and Paintsville. It officially opened on 24 November 1939.

The club's 18-hole golf course opened on 27 September 1929, and was designed by Paul B. Hall.

References

External links
Paintsville Golf Course

Buildings and structures completed in 1930
National Register of Historic Places in Johnson County, Kentucky
Golf clubs and courses in Kentucky
Clubhouses on the National Register of Historic Places in Kentucky
Event venues on the National Register of Historic Places in Kentucky
Golf clubs and courses on the National Register of Historic Places
1930 establishments in Kentucky
Works Progress Administration in Kentucky